Major Arthur Moon (17 May 1902 – 28 October 1973) was an Australian army doctor who saved the lives of dozens of Far East prisoners of war as the Thailand-Burma Railway was being constructed during World War II.

Early life
Moon was born on 17 May 1902 at East Maitland, New South Wales. By his early twenties he had embarked on a medical career as a gynecologist and obstetrician.

Military service

Moon enlisted in the Second Australian Imperial Force in 1940. Initially, he was a member of 2/4 Field Ambulance, which was in the Middle East and deployed into Syria. There he transferred to the 2/2 Casualty Clearing Station (CCS). In February 1942, Moon along with Colonel Ernest "Weary" Dunlop sailed from Suez and landed in Java to honour a British undertaking to assist the Dutch in the defence of Java. However, on 6 March the Dutch capitulated and the Australians, known as “Black” Force, became prisoners of war.

A General Hospital was established at with 23 officers including Arthur Moon as a Medical Officer. In January 1943 a party of around 900 POWs, known as “Dunlop” Force was assembled to move to Thailand under the command of "Weary" Dunlop.

The force arrived at Banpong in Thailand on 24 January and was trucked to Tarsau. From Tarsau the Force moved on foot approx 25 km to their first work area at Konyu where they arrived with 875 POWs.

Moon moved to Hintok Mountain Camp early April and was then sent to Tamarkan to take up the post of Senior Medical Officer. He took up the post on 1 May 1943 where he took charge of a camp that was not a proper hospital as it remained essentially unchanged from when the bamboo huts served as the quarters for POW workers that preceded them. Here Moon worked under a British Territorial Officer Lt Col Philip Toosey who was well-ordered and disciplined which helped with hygiene and the organisation of Moon's medical staff, mainly made up of enlisted soldiers.

On 3 May the first party of sick men arrived by barge at Tamarkan and after this, about 100 a day came. Many were delivered at night and left in the rice fields where parties had to be sent out to find them.

Moon was also at Chungkai and Tamuang at various times.

Record of conditions and atrocities
Moon is credited with causing one of the most comprehensive records of wartime Far East POW camp conditions and atrocities to come into being. He enlisted four prisoners with artistic skill, Ashley George Old, Jack Bridger Chalker, Philip Meninsky and Keith Neighbour, to create paintings of the camps, prisoners and injuries. The artists undertook this work in circumstances of extreme difficulty and danger.
Many of these paintings were buried in the ground at Moon's final camp, then recovered after the war and archived by the State Library of Victoria.

In 1995 an exhibition of the works was held under the title 'The Major Arthur Moon Collection'. The collection catalogue cover shows a painting of a beckoning hand titled 'Bomb wound (air attack)'  by Old and is compared in the narrative to Picasso's Guernica as a truly extraordinary image of war.

The Australian War Memorial holds photographs of Moon operating in the camps.
Arthur Moon Papers, Letters, and Medical Reports, including the diagrams and maps of burial sites of soldiers at the Tamarkan POW camp are held by The State Library of New South Wales, MLMSS 4234.

References

World War II prisoners of war held by Japan
Japanese prisoner of war and internment camps
Japanese war crimes
South-East Asian theatre of World War II
Australian prisoners of war
1902 births
1973 deaths
People from New South Wales
Burma Railway prisoners